The India A cricket team is a national cricket team representing India. It is the second-tier of Indian international cricket, below the full India national cricket team. The team is currently captained by Priyank Panchal in first-class cricket and Sanju Samson in List A cricket. The team is coached by former Saurashtra player Shitanshu Kotak.

The matches played by India A are not considered to be Test matches or One Day Internationals, instead receiving first-class and List A classification respectively.

The team also played in NKP Salve Challenger Trophy as India Red. The team names were changed for the 2006 version of this tournament. India A became India Red. The team has won the NKP Salve Challenger Trophy four times (2001/02, 2003/04, 2004,05, 2009/10) and shared the trophy thrice (1998/99, 2006/07, 2011/12).

Coaching staff 
 Head coach & Batting coach: Shitanshu Kotak
 Fielding coach: Munish Bali
 Fast Bowling Coach: Troy Cooley
 Spin Bowling Coach: Sairaj Bahutule
 Physiotherapist: Yogesh Parmar
 Strength & Conditioning Coach: Anand Date
 Performance Analyst: Devraj Raut
 Massuer: Mangesh Gaikwad

Current squad
International cap players are marked as Bold. This is the list of players who represented India A in at least 2 First-class or 8 List A matches in the latest home/away seasons.

See also 
 India Under-19 cricket team
 Indian cricket team

References

External links
Cricinfo India A

National 'A' cricket teams
1992 establishments in India